Fredy Neptune: A Novel in Verse (1998) is a verse novel by the Australian poet Les Murray.

Told in eight-line stanzas, Fredy Neptune describes the experiences of Fred Boettcher, an Australian of German parentage, during the years between the world wars. The work was described by the British poet Ruth Padel as "a haunting, loving, fiercely democratic epic by a master poet." It won the 1998 Queensland Premier's Literary Awards Fiction Book Award.

In Village Voice, Steve Burt wrote: "Fredy Neptune is Murray's best work yet, an almost completely successful round-the-world adventure novel in enticing, flexibly slangy (and very Australian-sounding) eight-line stanzas."

Structure
The work is divided into five sections:
Book I: The Middle Sea
Book II: Barking at the Thunder
Book III: Prop Sabres
Book IV: The Police Revolution
Book V: Lazarus Unstuck

References 

Verse novels
Australian poetry
Duffy & Snellgrove books
1998 Australian novels